The Sir Georg Solti International Conductors' Competition is a German competition for conductors that occurs biennially in Frankfurt, at the Alte Oper.  The cooperating music organisations are the Frankfurter Opern- und Museumsorchester and the hr-Sinfonieorchester.  The competition was founded in memory of Sir Georg Solti, who led the Frankfurt Opera during 1952–1961.  The patroness of the competition for many years was Valerie, Lady Solti, the widow of Sir Georg Solti.

Prize money
 the prize money is:
 1st prize €15,000
 2nd prize €10,000
 3rd prize €5,000
 Audience award

The audience award is linked to the symbolic handover of an original conducting baton from Sir Georg Solti from his time in Frankfurt.

The winners of the first and second prizes are given the prospect of conducting the Frankfurt Opera and Museum Orchestra (concert and opera) and the Frankfurt Radio Symphony Orchestra.
Other orchestras are holding out the prospect of guest conductors or assistance.

Recipients
 2002 2nd prize: Tomáš Netopil (Czech Republic). 3rd prize: Ching-Po Paul Chiang (Taiwan) and Ruben Gazarian (Armenia).
 2004 1st prize: James Gaffigan (United States) and Ivo Venkov (Bulgaria). 2nd prize: Johannes Gustavsson (Sweden).
 2006 1st prize: Shi-Yeon Sung (Korea) 2nd prize: Shizuo Z Kuwahara (United States). 3rd prize: Matthew Coore (Australia).
 2008 1st prize: Shizuo Z Kuwahara (United States). 2nd prize: Eugene Tzigane (United States). 3rd prize: Andreas Hotz (Germany).
 2010 1st prize: José Luís Gómez Ríos (Spain). 2nd prize: Kevin Griffiths (Great Britain). 3rd prize: Tito Muñoz (United States).
 2012 1st prize: Daye Lin (China). 2nd prize: Daniel Smith (Australia). 3rd prize: Brandon Keith Brown (United States).
 2015 2nd prize: Tung-Chieh Chuang (Taiwan) and Elias Grandy (Germany). 3rd prize: Toby Thatcher (Australia). Audience award: Tung-Chieh Chuang (Taiwan).
 2017 1st prize: Valentin Uryupin (Russia). 2nd prize: Wilson Ng (Hong Kong). 3rd prize: Farkhad Khudyev (Turkmenistan). Audience award: Valentin Uryupin (Russia).
 2020 1st prize: Tianyi Lu (New Zealand). 2nd prize: Gábor Hontvári (Hungary) and Johannes Zahn (Germany). Audience award: Johannes Zahn (Germany).

References

External links
  

Conducting competitions
Biennial events